INS Trinkat is a patrol vessel of the Indian Navy were designed and constructed by Garden Reach Shipbuilders and Engineers in Kolkata, West Bengal.

Role
The patrol vessel carry out fisheries protection, anti-poaching, counter-insurgency and search-and-rescue operations in coastal areas and in the exclusive economic zone. The vessels of the class are named after the Trinkat Island from the Andaman and Nicobar Islands or the Lakshadweep Islands.

See also 
Action of 30 March 2010
List of active Indian Navy ships

References

Trinkat-class patrol vessels
Ships built in India
2000 ships